Călinești is a commune in Teleorman County, Muntenia, Romania. It is composed of five villages: Antonești, Călinești, Copăceanca, Licuriciu and Marița.

Natives
 Victor Antonescu

References

Communes in Teleorman County
Localities in Muntenia